The 90-10 rule refers to a U.S. regulation that governs for-profit higher education. It caps the percentage of revenue that a proprietary school can receive from federal financial aid sources at 90%; the other 10% of revenue must come from alternative sources.

Not all federal sources of financial aid fall under this cap. In particular, funds supporting the education of troops and veterans, such as the G.I. Bill and Department of Defense Tuition Assistance program, are not subject to this cap.

The rule is intended to use a market mechanism to weed out the worst performing proprietary schools. The requirement’s intent was to ensure that no school could rely solely on federal funding.

Since 2010, growing scrutiny of the for-profit industry has spurred new efforts to strengthen the 90-10 rule. Some veteran and military groups have pushed for the G.I. Bill and Tuition Assistance Program to be included in the funds that are capped. Democratic lawmakers have sought new regulations to improve reporting and transparency in the rule.

History of the 90-10 Rule 
The origin of the 90-10 rule lies in the history of veteran’s education benefits. Following World War II, a number of proprietary, fly-by-night colleges emerged to meet the heightened demand for colleges from returning troops. Concerned with the quality of these schools, the Veteran Administration instituted an 85-15 rule, capping the percentage of a school’s revenue from GI Bill funds at 85%.

In 1972, for-profit colleges became eligible to receive federal student financial aid under Title IV. There were then no restrictions on the percentage of revenue that could be received from these sources.

In the 1990s, lawmakers became concerned with the quality and recruiting practices of for-profit colleges. Almost half of student loan defaults came from for-profit school students despite comprising just a fifth of loans. This growing concern led to new efforts to impose more regulations on the industry.

The result was included in the 1992 Higher Education Act, which included the first iteration of today’s 90-10 rule. It required that a for-profit school receive no more than 85% of its revenue from Title IV financial aid sources. This rule was modeled after the earlier Veteran Administration regulation.

During the 1998 reauthorization of the Higher Education Act, Congress changed the 85-15 rule to the 90-10 rule. Now for-profit colleges could receive up to 90%, rather than 85%, of revenue from Title IV funds.

In March 2021 the US Senate removed the 90-10 loophole as part of the 2021 Covid relief bill. As a bi-partisan compromise, the measure would not take effect until 2023.

Recent Efforts to Modify the 90-10 Rule 
With again increasing scrutiny of the for-profit school industry, the 90-10 rule has againWhen? This sentence added in 2016 become controversial. Many advocates are pushing efforts to modify the 90-10 rule.

Include Military and Veteran Benefits in the 90-10 Cap 
Military and veteran benefits, such as the GI Bill and Department of Defense Tuition Assistance Program, are not subject to the 90-10 cap. Many for-profit colleges sought to take advantage of this exclusion and focused their recruiting on troops and veterans.

In 2012, the Senate Health, Education, Labor and Pension Committee investigation revealed the deceptive practices that some for-profit colleges use to recruit troops and veterans. Recruiters faced significant pressure to attract military veterans; some recruiters were found to falsely promise that veterans and military benefits would cover the full cost of school. Others published military themed websites, such as GIBill.com, to push troops and veterans to toward for-profit colleges.

This report helped jumpstart an effort among some Congressional lawmakers and military and veterans groups to have military and veteran benefits included in the 90-10 cap. Many Members of Congress, including Democratic senators Dick Durbin, Tom Carper, and Richard Blumenthal and Representative Jackie Speier, introduced legislation to close this "loophole." None of these efforts succeeded.

The push to include military and veteran benefits in the 90-10 cap has garnered fierce opposition from the for-profit school industry group, the Career Education Colleges and Universities, previously known as the Association of Private Sector Colleges and Universities.

Many proprietary colleges receive more than 90% of their revenue from federal sources if military and veteran benefits are included in the calculation.   A 2014 report from the Center for Investigative Reporting showed that more than 133 schools would fail the 90-10 rule if military and veteran benefits were included.

Efforts to make this change continue. In November 2015, Senator Dick Durbin [D-IL] introduced legislation to include military and veteran benefits in the 90-10 cap. The bill remains stuck in the Senate Health, Education, Labor and Pension Committee. President Barack Obama expressed support for the bill shortly after its introduction.

In 2015, Secretary Hillary Clinton expressed support for the inclusion of military and veteran education benefits in the 90% cap.

Reduce the 90-10 Cap to 85-15 
Some lawmakers are also trying to lower the percentage of revenue a for-profit school can receive from federal funds from 90% to 85%. If military and veteran benefits were included in this lower cap, the Center for Investigative Reporting found that an additional 292 schools would fail this lower standard.

The change was included in the stalled Protecting Our Students and Taxpayers Act of 2015, introduced by Senators Dick Durbin, Jack Reed, Elizabeth Warren, and Richard Blumenthal. In his 2017 Budget proposal, President Obama requested that the cap be lowered from 90% to 85%.

References

Education in the United States